Joe Darensbourg (July 9, 1906 – May 24, 1985) was an American, New Orleans-based jazz clarinetist and saxophonist, notable for his work with Buddy Petit, Jelly Roll Morton, Charlie Creath, Fate Marable, Andy Kirk, Kid Ory, Wingy Manone, Joe Liggins and Louis Armstrong.

Discography
 "Yellow Dog Blues", Joe Darensbourg and his Dixie Flyers, Lark Records
 On a Lark in Dixieland
 "Louis Armstrong tour in Australia", including also vocalist Jewel Brown, is available on video

References

1906 births
1985 deaths
20th-century clarinetists
20th-century American saxophonists
20th-century American male musicians
American jazz bandleaders
American jazz clarinetists
American jazz saxophonists
American male saxophonists
Dixieland clarinetists
Dixieland saxophonists
Jazz musicians from New Orleans
American male jazz musicians